Pedro Horrillo Muñoz (27 September 1974 in Eibar, Basque Country) is a Spanish retired racing cyclist who rode as a professional for Mapei, Quick-Step and . He was forced to retire from professional cycling after a crash in the 2009 Giro d'Italia.

Professional career
Before turning professional in 1998, Horrillo was a philosophy student at the University of the Basque Country. Horrillo turned professional with the Vitalicio Seguros team which included notable names such as Óscar Freire and Juan Miguel Mercado who would win three stages between them in the 2006 Tour de France. His biggest win was a stage at the 2004 Paris–Nice race.

In 2005, Horrillo won a stage at the 2005 Volta a Catalunya and nearly won a stage at the 2005 Vuelta a España with a late attack until he was caught 200 metres from the line. Horrillo is a self-confessed fan of Paris–Roubaix, describing it as: "If I could only have ridden one race as a pro, that would have been it - and if possible, in the rain because that's the real Roubaix when it rains" (Cycle Sport magazine interview, November 2006 issue).

Giro d'Italia crash and career end
On 16 May 2009, during the eighth stage of the Giro d'Italia, Horrillo experienced a horror crash, leaving him with life-threatening injuries. He had missed a curve in the descent of the Colle San Pietro and fallen 60 meters into a ravine before alpine paramedics could recover him. He was found because his bike had clung onto the railing by the roadside, as he was alone when the crash happened. He woke up in the ambulance on its way hospital, but doctors put him into a chemically induced coma to aid his treatment, having suffered multiple fractures to his thigh bones, kneecap and neck, in addition to a punctured lung. The next day, largely in reaction to Horrillo's dramatic injury, the peloton protested the safety conditions in the Giro, which led to Stage 9 being neutralized. He was taken out of the coma the following day, with scans revealing no brain injury, and Rabobank team doctors stated that he was to be moved to a hospital in Spain within ten days. Five weeks after the crash, after being transferred to Spain, it was announced that Horrillo was able to go home. Although he recovered from the injuries, he retired from professional cycling, unable to compete at the same level.

Outside the peloton
A philosophy graduate, Horrillo is known as a good writer and has written columns for Dutch paper de Volkskrant during the Tour de France and has been a regular contributor to the Spanish newspaper El País. In 2009 he wrote a column concerning the UCI's whereabouts system called El Señor Adams  for El País. The English version was entitled Mr Adams. He has a wife named Lorena.

Major results

2000
 1st Stage 9 Volta a Portugal
 2nd Overall Vuelta a Mallorca
 2nd Trofeo Andratx–Mirador d'es Colomer
2001
 3rd Gran Premio Nobili Rubinetterie
 5th Overall Niedersachsen-Rundfahrt
1st Stage 2
 6th US Pro Championship
 10th Overall Peace Race
2002
 1st Stage 1 Euskal Bizikleta
2003
 3rd Overall UNIQA Classic
1st Stage 1
2004
 1st Stage 2 Paris–Nice
 1st Stage 4 UNIQA Classic
2005
 1st Stage 3 Volta a Catalunya
2006
 1st Stage 1 Sachsen-Tour

References

External links

Horillo interview

Cyclists from the Basque Country (autonomous community)
Spanish male cyclists
1974 births
Living people
University of the Basque Country alumni
Sportspeople from Eibar